Paweł Ptak (born 28 January 1983) is a Polish sprinter. He won a silver medal in the 4 × 400 m relay at the 2006 IAAF World Indoor Championships, although he only participated in the heats. His team won third place in the 4 × 100 m relay at the 2001 European Athletics Junior Championships.

References

External links 
 
 
 Paweł Ptak at Polski Związek Lekkiej Atletyki 

1983 births
Living people
Polish male sprinters
World Athletics Indoor Championships medalists
21st-century Polish people